Gary Anthony Cadogan (born 1966), is a male former athlete who competed for England at 400m Hurdles.

Athletics career
Cadogan was the English national champion after winning the 1993 UK Athletics Championships and 1993 AAA Championships.

He represented England in the 400 metres hurdles event, at the 1994 Commonwealth Games in Victoria, British Columbia, Canada.

References

1966 births
Athletes (track and field) at the 1994 Commonwealth Games
Living people
English male hurdlers
Doping cases in athletics
English sportspeople in doping cases
Commonwealth Games competitors for England